The Fundy Shore Ecotour is a former scenic drive and network of tourist destinations in the Canadian province of Nova Scotia and encircles several sub-basins of the Bay of Fundy, which contains the highest tidal range on the planet.

The Fundy Shore Ecotour ran from Brooklyn, Hants County in the south, to Amherst, Cumberland County near the inter-provincial boundary with New Brunswick in the north.  It followed the shores of Chignecto Bay, Minas Basin, and Cobequid Bay and overlaps with and extends the Glooscap Trail in many places.

Some remnant signage of the Fundy Shore Ecotour still remain, but the route has been largely replaced by the Glooscap Trail and Fundy Shore Scenic Drive.

Communities

Amherst
River Hebert
Joggins
Advocate Harbour
Parrsboro
Five Islands
Economy
Bass River
Glenholme
Onslow
Truro
Old Barns
Clifton
Beaver Brook
Green Oaks
Maitland
Selma
Noel Shore
Onslow
Minasville
Moose Brook
Tenecape
Walton
Pembroke
Cambridge
Bramber
Cheverie
Kempt Shore
Summerville
Centre Burlington
Brooklyn

Parks
Cape Chignecto Provincial Park
Central Grove Provincial Park 
Clairmont Provincial Park
Five Islands Provincial Park

Museums
Fundy Geological Museum
Age of Sail Heritage Centre
Joggins Fossil Cliffs

Highways
Trunk 2 
Route 215
Route 236
Route 242
Route 209
Route 302

References

Books
 

Roads in Colchester County
Roads in Hants County, Nova Scotia
Roads in Cumberland County, Nova Scotia
Tourist attractions in Colchester County
Tourist attractions in Hants County, Nova Scotia
Tourist attractions in Cumberland County, Nova Scotia